The 2022–23 season is the 98th season in the existence of Rotherham United Football Club and the club's first season back in the Championship since the 2020–21 season, following their promotion from League One last season. In addition to the league, they will also compete in the 2022–23 FA Cup and the 2022–23 EFL Cup.

Players

Current squad
.

Out on loan

Squad statistics

Player statistics
 
Players with zero appearances have been unused substitutes in one or more games.

Goalscorers

Pre-season and friendlies
On 18 May 2022, Crewe Alexandra confirmed a home pre-season fixture (for 23 July) with Rotherham United; though the match was later removed from the Crewe's original press release. A day later it was confirmed Paul Warne would take his side overseas to Croatia for a warm-weather training camp in July. The Millers announced their first pre-season fixture against Parkgate. A second followed six days later, against Doncaster Rovers. A trip to Salford City was also added to the pre-season calendar. Harrogate Town was next added to the pre-season calendar. A fifth away friendly was also confirmed, against Mansfield Town. Millers''' final friendly was announced to be against Crewe Alexandra on 23 July. A behind-closed-doors meeting against Fleetwood Town in Croatia was confirmed in July.

Competitions
Overall record

Championship

League table

Results summary

Results by round

Matches

On 23 June, the league fixtures were announced.

FA Cup

The Millers'' were drawn away to Ipswich Town in the third round.

EFL Cup

Rotherham were drawn away to Port Vale in the first round and at home to Morecambe in the second round.

Transfers

In

Out

Loans in

Loans out

References

Rotherham United
Rotherham United F.C. seasons
English football clubs 2022–23 season